The 2017 Ligue de Football de Saint Pierre et Miquelon will be the 32nd season of top-division football in Saint Pierre and Miquelon. Three clubs will compete in the league: AS Saint Pierraise, A.S. Miquelonnaise and A.S. Ilienne Amateur. The three teams played each other eight times, composing of a 16-match season starting in May 2017 and ending in September 2017.

Saint Pierraise are the defending champions.

Clubs

Table

References 

Ligue de Football de Saint Pierre et Miquelon seasons
Saint Pierre and Miquelon
Prem